Donegal Presbyterian Church Complex is an historic Presbyterian church complex on Donegal Springs Road in East Donegal Township, Lancaster County, Pennsylvania. The church was built in 1732, and is a one-and-one-half story, three-bay-by-five bay, stuccoed stone building with a gambrel roof.

History and architectural features
The chapel underwent a remodeling in 1851. The adjacent cemetery is enclosed in a rough-hewn stone wall built in 1791. The property also includes the William Kerr Study House, a one-and-one-half story, five-bay brick dwelling originally built in 1810 and expanded in the early 20th century. The building was restored in 1976.

It was listed on the National Register of Historic Places in 1985.

In 1777, during worship services, word came to the congregation by way of an express rider, that the British General Howe was about to invade Pennsylvania. The message relayed was that the British army had advanced and had forced Washington's troops to retreat to Chadds Ford. The rider found Colonel Alexander Lowry, who was attending worship at Donegal that Sunday, and shared the news with him, to encourage Lowry to organize his men to come to General Washington's defense.

Upon learning this news, the congregation gathered around a white oak tree just outside the sanctuary. With hands joined, they vowed allegiance to the cause of the patriots, and their minister, Rev. Colin McFarquhar, who up until that time had always prayed for the King of England, united with them. From that time onward, the tree was known as the “Witness Tree.”

The original Witness Tree grew and flourished for nearly three centuries, but succumbed to disease. A cast iron memorial exists in its place now.

Notable burials
Richard A. Snyder (1910-1992), Pennsylvania State Senator

Gallery

References

External links

Official website

Cemeteries in Lancaster County, Pennsylvania
Churches on the National Register of Historic Places in Pennsylvania
Churches in Lancaster County, Pennsylvania
Presbyterian churches in Pennsylvania
Historic districts on the National Register of Historic Places in Pennsylvania
National Register of Historic Places in Lancaster County, Pennsylvania